Sir Gilbert Pickering, 1st Baronet, 10 March 1611 to 17 October 1668, was a member of the landed gentry from Northamptonshire, and a religious Independent who supported Parliament in the Wars of the Three Kingdoms. An MP for Northamptonshire for most of the period from 1640 to 1660, during the 1649 to 1660 Interregnum he also served as Lord Chamberlain, sat on the English Council of State, and was appointed to Cromwell's Upper House in 1658.

Although appointed a judge at the Trial of Charles I in January 1649, Pickering attended only two sessions and did not sign the Execution warrant, which saved him from being classed as a regicide following the 1660 Stuart Restoration. He received a pardon with the help of his brother-in-law Edward Montagu, 1st Earl of Sandwich, but was banned from holding public office, and died at home in October 1668.

Personal details
Gilbert Pickering was born 10 March 1611 in Titchmarsh, Northamptonshire, eldest son of Sir John Pickering (1585–1628), and Susannah Dryden (d.1661). A devout Puritan, his father was arrested in January 1627 for refusing to pay "loans" imposed by Charles I, and although released from prison a few months later due to illness, died in January 1628. Gilbert had two younger brothers, John (1615–1645), who became a colonel in the New Model Army and died of fever on active service, and Edward (1617–1698), as well as a sister Mary (1615–?).

In May 1638, Pickering married Elizabeth Montagu (d.1679), daughter of Sir Sidney Montagu, a judge in the Court of Requests. They had eight sons and four daughters, including his eldest child and heir John (1640–1703), Elizabeth (1642–1728), Oliver (1645–1669), Montegue (1654–1694), and Jane (1659–1685).

Career 
Pickering graduated from Emmanuel College, Cambridge in 1625, entered Gray's Inn to study law in 1629, and shortly after his 1638 marriage purchased a baronetcy in Novia Scotia. Like his brother John, he was originally a Presbyterian, who wanted to restructure the Church of England along lines similar to the reformed Church of Scotland established by the Covenanters in 1639. He later became a religious Independent, one of those who rejected any State religion, and was suspected of being an Anabaptist, a sect viewed as heretical by other Protestants, and widely persecuted in both Europe and the New England Colonies as a result.        

First elected as MP for Northamptonshire in April 1640, Pickering retained this seat in every Parliament until April 1660. When the First English Civil War began in August 1642, he joined the Parliamentarian Committee for Northamptonshire, and was most active as "a sequester and committee man". In late 1644, he supported Oliver Cromwell's criticisms of Essex and Manchester, the former for his defeat at Lostwithiel, the latter for failing to exploit victory at Marston Moor and bungling the Second Battle of Newbury. John Pickering, who fought at Marston Moor and Newbury, was one of the witnesses on whom Cromwell relied in the attack on Manchester that led to his removal under the Self-denying Ordinance.

Parliament's victory in 1646 was followed by two years of arguments over the peace settlement between moderate Presbyterians and the leadership of the New Model Army. Although Pickering largely avoided involvement, as an Independent he was generally viewed as an Army supporter, and thus kept his seat in the Rump Parliament established after Pride's Purge in December 1648. He was appointed one of the judges in the January 1649 trial of Charles I, but only attended two sessions and did not sign the death warrant.

He remained MP for Northamptonshire through the Interregnum 1648–1660 and was appointed Lord Chamberlain to Oliver Cromwell in 1657. His public career ended in 1660. With the help of his brother-in-law Edward Montagu, 1st Earl of Sandwich, Pickering obtained a pardon from King Charles II. The original of the pardon delivered by Charles II on vellum in Latin is in the Pitts Theology Library of Emory University, MS no 109.

Pickering was also cousin to the poet, John Dryden, who grew up in Titchmarsh; monuments to Dryden and his parents were erected at Titchmarsh by his daughter Elizabeth, whose 1668 marriage was attended by her distant relative, Samuel Pepys. Sir Gilbert and his descendants are commemorated by tombs and memorials in Saint Mary the Virgin, Titchmarsh.

Notes

References

Sources
 
 
 
 
 

1668 deaths
Pickering, 1st Baronet
1611 births
Members of Gray's Inn
Alumni of Emmanuel College, Cambridge
Gilbert
English Presbyterians
English Anabaptists
17th-century Presbyterians
17th-century Anabaptists
English MPs 1640 (April)
English MPs 1640–1648
English MPs 1648–1653